This is a list of members of the 3rd Bundestag – the lower house of parliament of the Federal Republic of Germany, whose members were in office from 1957 until 1961.



Summary 
This summary includes changes in the numbers of the four caucuses (CDU/CSU, SPD, FDP, German Party):

Members

A 

 Ernst Achenbach, FDP
 Annemarie Ackermann, CDU
 Raban Adelmann, CDU
 Konrad Adenauer, CDU
 Heinrich Aigner, CSU
 Luise Albertz, SPD
 Lisa Albrecht, SPD (until 16 May 1958)
 Jakob Altmaier, SPD
 Wilhelm Altvater, SPD (from 22 September 1960)
 Josef Arndgen, CDU
 Adolf Arndt, SPD
 Karl Arnold, CDU (until 29 June 1958)
 Karl Atzenroth, FDP
 Heinrich Auge, SPD

B 

 Fritz Baade, SPD
 Robert Bach, SPD (from 27 October 1959)
 Harri Bading, SPD
 Fritz Baier, CDU
 Albert Baldauf, CDU
 Siegfried Balke, CSU
 Bernhard Balkenhol, CDU
 Hans Bals, SPD
 Siegfried Bärsch, SPD
 Wolfgang Bartels, CDU
 Rainer Barzel, CDU
 Hannsheinz Bauer, SPD
 Josef Bauer, CSU
 Friedrich Bauereisen, CSU
 Bernhard Bauknecht, CDU
 Rudolf Bäumer, SPD
 Valentin Baur, SPD
 Paul Bausch, CDU
 Hans Bay, SPD (from 20 December 1960)
 Helmut Bazille, SPD
 Karl Bechert, SPD
 Max Becker, FDP (until 29 July 1960)
 Curt Becker, CDU
 Josef Becker, CDU
 Walter Behrendt, SPD
 Arno Behrisch, Other
 Ernst Benda, CDU
 Franziska Bennemann, SPD
 August Berberich, CDU
 Fritz Berendsen, CDU (until 15 September 1959)
 Urich Berger, CDU
 Margarete Berger-Heise, SPD
 Karl Bergmann, SPD
 Bernhard Bergmeyer, CDU
 Karl-Wilhelm Berkhan, SPD
 August Berlin, SPD
 Anton Besold, CSU
 Emil Bettgenhäuser, SPD
 Lucie Beyer, SPD
 Willi Birkelbach, SPD
 Kurt Birrenbach, CDU
 Otto Christian Archibald von Bismarck, CDU
 Peter Blachstein, SPD
 Theodor Blank, CDU
 Paul Bleiß, SPD
 Hildegard Bleyler, CDU
 Hans Blöcker, CDU
 Irma Blohm, CDU
 Franz Blücher, DP (until 28 February 1958)
 Ernst von Bodelschwingh, CDU
 Franz Böhm, CDU
 Holger Börner, SPD
 Peter Wilhelm Brand, CDU
 Aenne Brauksiepe, CDU
 Julyus Brecht, SPD
 Heinrich von Brentano, CDU
 Wilhelm Brese, CDU
 Else Brökelschen, CDU
 Josef Brönner, CDU (until 21 January 1958)
 Valentin Brück, CDU
 Johannes Brüns, CDU (from 26 October 1959 until 28 November 1960)
 August Bruse, SPD
 Gerd Bucerius, CDU
 Ewald Bucher, FDP
 Karl August Bühler, CDU
 Fritz Burgbacher, CDU
 Alfred Burgemeister, CDU
 Fritz Büttner, SPD

C 

 Johannes Caspers, CDU
 Adolf Cillien, CDU (until 29 April 1960)
 Kurt Conrad, SPD (until 20 July 1959)
 Hermann Conring, CDU
 Fritz Corterier, SPD
 Johann Cramer, SPD
 Herbert Czaja, CDU

D 

 Rolf Dahlgrün, FDP
 Thomas Dehler, FDP
 Heinrich Deist, SPD
 Hans Demmelmeier, CSU
 Arved Deringer, CDU
 Georg Dewald, SPD
 Hermann Diebäcker, CDU
 Bruno Diekmann, SPD
 Anton Diel, SPD (until 6 April 1959)
 Jakob Diel, CDU
 Emmy Diemer-Nicolaus, FDP
 Stefan Dittrich, CSU
 Clara Döhring, SPD
 Werner Dollinger, CSU
 Wilhelm Dopatka, SPD
 Wolfgang Döring, FDP
 Otto Dowidat, FDP
 Hans Drachsler, CSU
 Heinrich Draeger, CDU
 August Dresbach, CDU
 Wilhelm Dröscher, SPD
 Hermann Dürr, FDP

E 

 Anton Eberhard, FDP (from 4 November 1959)
 Walter Eckhardt, CSU (from 27 December 1957)
 Hermann Ehren, CDU
 Ernst Theodor Eichelbaum, CDU
 Elfriede Eilers, SPD
 Jan Eilers, FDP
 Otto Eisenmann, FDP
 Alexander Elbrächter, CDU
 Ernst Engelbrecht-Greve, CDU
 Margarete Engländer, CDU
 Arthur Enk, CDU
 Hermann A. Eplée, CDU (from 8 September 1958)
 Ludwig Erhard, CDU
 Fritz Erler, SPD
 Fritz Eschmann, SPD
 Franz Etzel, CDU
 Peter Etzenbach, CDU
 August-Martin Euler, DP (until 10 September 1958)
 Bert Even, CDU
 Johannes Even, CDU

F 

 Walter Faller, SPD
 Josef Felder, SPD
 Otto Freiherr von Feury, CSU (until 10 December 1957)
 Hermann Finckh, CDU
 Erwin Folger, SPD (from 19 May 1958)
 Egon Franke, SPD
 Ludwig Franz, CSU
 Jakob Franzen, CDU
 Günter Frede, SPD
 Heinz Frehsee, SPD
 Alfred Frenzel, SPD (until 4 November 1960)
 Martin Frey, CDU
 Ferdinand Friedensburg, CDU
 Lotte Friese-Korn, FDP
 Gerhard Fritz, CDU
 Friedrich Fritz, CDU
 Gustav Fuchs, CSU
 Friedrich Funk, CSU
 Hans Furler, CDU

G 

 Mathilde Gantenberg, CDU
 Walter Gaßmann, CDU
 Gustav-Adolf Gedat, CDU
 Albrecht Gehring, CDU
 Hans Geiger, SPD
 Hugo Geiger, CSU
 Ingeborg Geisendörfer, CSU
 Robert Geritzmann, SPD
 Heinrich Gerns, CDU
 Eugen Gerstenmaier, CDU
 Heinrich Gewandt, CDU
 Paul Gibbert, CDU
 Christian Giencke, CDU
 Fritz Glahn, FDP (until 2 November 1959)
 Alfred Gleisner, SPD (until 17 March 1959)
 Franz Gleissner, CSU
 Hermann Glüsing, CDU
 Josef Gockeln, CDU (until 6 December 1958)
 Wilhelm Goldhagen, CDU
 Wilhelm Gontrum, CDU
 Hermann Mathias Görgen, CSU
 Karl Gossel, CDU
 Leo Gottesleben, CDU
 Hermann Götz, CDU
 Carlo Graaff, FDP (until 8 May 1959)
 Johann Baptist Gradl, CDU
 Otto Heinrich Greve, SPD
 Wilhelm Gülich, SPD (until 15 April 1960)
 Bernhard Günther, CDU
 Karl Theodor Freiherr von und zu Guttenberg, CSU

H 

 Hermann Haage, SPD
 Karl Hackethal, CDU
 Karl Hahn, CDU
 Dietrich Hahne, CDU (from 7 December 1959)
 Heinrich Hamacher, SPD
 Fritz von Haniel-Niethammer, CSU
 Hermann Hansing, SPD
 Walter Harm, SPD (until 22 September 1961)
 Johann Harnischfeger, CDU
 Herbert Hauffe, SPD
 Hugo Hauser, CDU (from 11 March 1960)
 Erwin Häussler, CDU
 Bruno Heck, CDU
 Johann Karl Heide, SPD
 Rudolf-Ernst Heiland, SPD
 Gustav Heinemann, SPD
 Fritz Heinrich, SPD (until 7 March 1959)
 Martin Heix, CDU
 Josef Hellenbrock, SPD
 Fritz Hellwig, CDU (until 30 November 1959)
 Georg Graf Henckel von Donnersmarck, CSU (from 5 September 1959)
 Luise Herklotz, SPD
 Hans Hermsdorf, SPD
 Karl Herold, SPD
 Carl Hesberg, CDU
 Clemens Hesemann, CDU
 Hellmuth Heye, CDU
 Anton Hilbert, CDU
 Hermann Höcherl, CSU
 Wilhelm Höck, CDU
 Heinrich Höcker, SPD
 Heinrich Höfler, CDU
 Egon Höhmann, SPD
 Franz Höhne, SPD
 Ernst Holla, CDU
 Matthias Hoogen, CDU
 Fritz Wilhelm Hörauf, SPD
 Peter Horn, CDU
 Viktor Hoven, FDP
 Elinor Hubert, SPD
 Karl Hübner, FDV (Gast der CDU/CSU-Fraktion, ab 1 January 1959 CDU)
 Josef Hufnagel, SPD
 Eugen Huth, CDU
 Lambert Huys, CDU

I 

 Joseph Illerhaus, CDU
 Wolfgang Imle, FDP (from 29 June 1960)
 Hans Iven, SPD

J 

 Werner Jacobi, SPD
 Peter Jacobs, SPD
 Richard Jaeger, CSU
 Hans Jahn, SPD (until 10 July 1960)
 Artur Jahn, CDU
 Gerhard Jahn, SPD
 Wenzel Jaksch, SPD
 Pascual Jordan, CDU
 Johann Peter Josten, CDU
 Hans-Jürgen Junghans, SPD
 Hubert Jungherz, SPD (from 19 January 1960)
 Nikolaus Jürgensen, SPD

K 

 Hellmut Kalbitzer, SPD
 Margot Kalinke, CDU
 Karl Kanka, CDU
 Hans Katzer, CDU
 Irma Keilhack, SPD
 Ernst Keller, FDP
 Emil Kemmer, CSU
 Friedrich Kempfler, CSU
 Alma Kettig, SPD
 Dietrich Keuning, SPD
 Kurt Georg Kiesinger, CDU (until 19 February 1959)
 Arthur Killat, SPD (from 19 March 1959)
 Georg Richard Kinat, Other
 Liesel Kipp-Kaule, SPD
 Peterheinrich Kirchhoff, CDU
 Gerhard Kisters, CDU (from 21 September 1959)
 Wolfgang Klausner, CSU (until 17 April 1958)
 Elfriede Klemmert, CDU
 Georg Kliesing, CDU
 Ludwig Knobloch, CDU
 Friedrich Knorr, CSU
 , CDU
 Jakob Koenen, SPD
 Otto Köhler, FDP (until 27 June 1960)
 Oswald Adolph Kohut, FDP
 Willy Könen, SPD
 Wilhelm Königswarter, SPD
 Hermann Kopf, CDU
 Lisa Korspeter, SPD
 Waldemar Kraft, CDU
 Angelo Kramel, CSU
 Karl Krammig, CDU
 Edith Krappe, SPD
 Friedrich Kraus, SPD
 Reinhold Kreitmeyer, FDP
 Gerhard Kreyssig, SPD
 Herbert Kriedemann, SPD
 Ludwig Kroll, CDU
 Heinrich Krone, CDU
 Georg Krug, CSU
 Caspar Krüger, CDU (from 15 December 1958)
 Hans Krüger, CDU
 Edeltraud Kuchtner, CSU
 Knut von Kühlmann-Stumm, FDP (from 8 August 1960)
 Walter Kühlthau, CDU
 Heinz Kühn, SPD
 Walther Kühn, FDP
 August Kunst, CDU
 Ernst Kuntscher, CDU
 Johannes Kunze, CDU (until 11 October 1959)
 Georg Kurlbaum, SPD

L 

 Georg Lang, CSU
 Erwin Lange, SPD
 Wilhelm Lantermann, SPD
 Hans Lautenschlager, SPD (from 9 November 1960)
 Georg Leber, SPD
 Albert Leicht, CDU
 Walter Leiske, CDU
 Ernst Lemmer, CDU
 Aloys Lenz, CDU
 Hans Lenz, FDP
 Franz Lenze, CDU
 Gottfried Leonhard, CDU
 Josef Lermer, CSU
 Edmund Leukert, CSU (from 21 April 1958)
 Paul Leverkuehn, CDU (until 1 March 1960)
 Hanns-Gero von Lindeiner, CDU (from 8 September 1959)
 Heinrich Lindenberg, CDU
 Hermann Lindrath, CDU (until 27 February 1960)
 Fritz Logemann, FDP
 Ulrich Lohmar, SPD
 Walter Löhr, CDU
 Heinrich Lübke, CDU (until 2 September 1959)
 Johannes Lücke, SPD
 Paul Lücke, CDU
 Hans August Lücker, CSU
 Marie-Elisabeth Lüders, FDP
 Adolf Ludwig, SPD
 Wilhelm Adam Lulay, CDU (from 23 February 1959)
 Karl-Heinz Lünenstraß, SPD

M 

 Ernst Majonica, CDU
 Georg Baron Manteuffel-Szoege, CSU
 Robert Margulies, FDP
 Berthold Martin, CDU
 Franz Marx, SPD
 Heinz Matthes, Other (GDP)
 Kurt Mattick, SPD
 Oskar Matzner, SPD
 Eugen Maucher, CDU (from 30 January 1958)
 Adolf Mauk, FDP
 Agnes Katharina Maxsein, CDU
 Reinhold Mayer, FDP (until 30 September 1959)
 Friedrich Mayer, SPD (until 14 December 1960)
 Josef Mayer, CDU
 Hans Meis, CDU (from 2 July 1958)
 Karl Meitmann, SPD
 Wilhelm Mellies, SPD (until 19 May 1958)
 Linus Memmel, CSU
 Erich Mende, FDP
 Theodor Mengelkamp, CDU
 Josef Menke, CDU
 Fritz Mensing, CDU
 Walter Menzel, SPD
 Hans-Joachim von Merkatz, CDU
 Hans Merten, SPD
 Rudolf Metter, SPD
 Ludwig Metzger, SPD
 Erich Meyer, SPD
 Ernst Wilhelm Meyer, SPD
 Philipp Meyer, CSU
 Emmy Meyer-Laule, SPD
 Franz Meyers, CDU (until 4 September 1958)
 Josef Mick, CDU
 Herwart Miessner, FDP (from 21 May 1959)
 Wolfgang Mischnick, FDP
 Karl Mommer, SPD
 Richard Muckermann, CDU
 Klaus Freiherr von Mühlen, FDP (from 6 October 1959)
 Franz Mühlenberg, CDU
 Hans Müller, SPD
 Karl Müller, SPD
 Willy Müller, SPD
 Ernst Müller-Hermann, CDU
 Oskar Munzinger, SPD (from 20 April 1959 until 1 October 1959)
 Leonhard Murr, FDP
 Franzjosef Müser, CDU

N 

 Friederike Nadig, SPD
 Peter Nellen, SPD
 Kurt Neubauer, SPD
 August Neuburger, CDU
 Franz Neumann, SPD
 Wilhelm Nieberg, CDU
 Alois Niederalt, CSU
 Maria Niggemeyer, CDU

O 

 Theodor Oberländer, CDU
 Willy Odenthal, SPD
 Josef Oesterle, CSU (until 31 August 1959)
 Richard Oetzel, CDU
 Erich Ollenhauer, SPD

P 

 Maria Pannhoff, CDU
 Ernst Paul, SPD
 Georg Pelster, CDU
 Ernst Pernoll, CDU (until 15 July 1959)
 Georg Peters, SPD
 Robert Pferdmenges, CDU
 Walter Pflaumbaum, CDU
 Gerhard Philipp, CDU
 Carl Pietscher, CDU
 Elisabeth Pitz-Savelsberg, CDU
 Kurt Pohle, SPD
 Heinz Pöhler, SPD
 Ludwig Preiß, CDU
 Carl Prennel, SPD
 Victor-Emanuel Preusker, CDU
 Moritz-Ernst Priebe, SPD
 Wilhelm Probst, CDU
 Maria Probst, CSU
 Werner Pusch, SPD
 Severin Fritz Pütz, SPD

R 

 Willy Max Rademacher, FDP
 Egon Wilhelm Ramms, FDP
 Hugo Rasch, SPD (until 15 September 1960)
 Will Rasner, CDU
 Ludwig Ratzel, SPD (until 21 June 1960)
 Rudolf Recktenwald, SPD (from 11 August 1959 until 20 October 1959)
 Karl Regling, SPD
 Luise Rehling, CDU
 Reinhold Rehs, SPD
 Carl Reinhard, CDU
 Eckhard Reith, CDU
 Wilhelm Reitz, SPD
 Richard Reitzner, SPD
 Annemarie Renger, SPD
 Hans Richarts, CDU
 Clemens Riedel, CDU
 Hugo Rimmelspacher, SPD (from 27 June 1960)
 Georg Ripken, CDU (from 10 March 1958)
 Heinrich Georg Ritzel, SPD
 Ernst Rodiek, SPD (from 15 July 1960)
 Helmut Rohde, SPD
 Dietrich Rollmann, CDU (from 7 March 1960)
 Josef Rommerskirchen, CDU (from 12 December 1960)
 Julie Rösch, CDU
 Josef Rösing, CDU
 Hans-Carl Rüdel, CDU
 Margarete Rudoll, SPD
 Thomas Ruf, CDU
 Heinrich-Wilhelm Ruhnke, SPD
 Franz Ruland, CSU
 Wolfgang Rutschke, FDP

S 

 Heinrich Sander, FDP
 Friedrich Schäfer, SPD
 Fritz Schäffer, CSU
 Marta Schanzenbach, SPD
 Hugo Scharnberg, CDU
 Ernst Scharnowski, SPD
 Walter Scheel, FDP
 Ernst Schellenberg, SPD
 Heinrich Scheppmann, CDU
 Josef Scheuren, SPD (from 20 March 1959)
 Heinrich Schild, CDU
 Albrecht Schlee, CSU
 Josef Schlick, CDU
 Alfred Schliestedt, SPD (from 29 September 1961)
 Carlo Schmid, SPD
 Helmut Schmidt, SPD
 Martin Schmidt, SPD
 Otto Schmidt, CDU
 Cläre Schmitt, CDU
 Hermann Schmitt-Vockenhausen, SPD
 Kurt Schmücker, CDU
 Ludwig Schneider, CDU (from 10 September 1958)
 Herbert Schneider, Other (GDP)
 , CDU
 Heinrich Schneider, FDP
 Erwin Schoettle, SPD
 Helmuth Schranz, Other (GDP)
 Nikolaus Schreiner, SPD (until 31 August 1958)
 Gerhard Schröder, CDU
 Kurt Schröder, SPD
 Richard Schröter, SPD
 Fritz-Rudolf Schultz, FDP
 Hubert Schulze-Pellengahr, CDU
 Josef Schüttler, CDU
 Hans Schütz, CSU
 Klaus Schütz, SPD
 Werner Schwarz, CDU
 Elisabeth Schwarzhaupt, CDU
 Hermann Schwörer, CDU (from 21 October 1958)
 Hans-Christoph Seebohm, CDU
 Roland Seffrin, CDU
 Max Seidel, SPD
 Franz Seidl, CSU
 Max Seither, SPD
 Elfriede Seppi, SPD (from 13 October 1959)
 Günther Serres, CDU
 Walter Seuffert, SPD
 Franz Seume, SPD
 Theodor Siebel, CDU
 J Hermann Siemer, CDU
 Karl Simpfendörfer, CDU
 Emil Solke, CDU
 August Spies, CDU
 Josef Spies, CSU
 Kurt Spitzmüller, FDP
 Willy Stahl, FDP
 Wolfgang Stammberger, FDP
 Heinz Starke, FDP
 Robert Stauch, CDU
 Josef Stecker, CDU
 Viktoria Steinbiß, CDU
 Willy Steinmetz, CDU
 Carl Stenger, SPD
 Georg Stierle, SPD
 Georg Stiller, CSU
 Josef Stingl, CDU
 Gerhard Stoltenberg, CDU
 Anton Storch, CDU
 Friedrich-Karl Storm, CDU
 Leo Storm, CDU
 Heinrich Sträter, SPD
 Franz Josef Strauß, CSU
 Otto Striebeck, SPD (from 27 May 1958)
 Käte Strobel, SPD
 Detlef Struve, CDU
 Richard Stücklen, CSU
 Gustav Sühler, CSU

T 

 Richard Tamblé, SPD (from 25 April 1960)
 Theodor Teriete, CDU
 Emil Theil, SPD (from 6 March 1960)
 Hanns Theis, SPD
 Peter Tobaben, CDU
 Hans Toussaint, CDU

U 

 Franz Xaver Unertl, CSU

V 

 Franz Varelmann, CDU
 Max Vehar, CDU
 Elisabeth Vietje, CDU (from 6 May 1960)
 Rudolf Vogel, CDU
 Karl-Heinz Vogt, CSU

W 

 Gerhard Wacher, CSU
 Friedrich Wilhelm Wagner, SPD
 Eduard Wahl, CDU
 Otto Walpert, SPD (until 12 January 1960)
 Fritz Walter, FDP
 Fritz Weber, FDP
 Helene Weber, CDU
 Karl Weber, CDU
 Heinz Wegener, SPD
 Heinrich Wehking, CDU
 Herbert Wehner, SPD
 Philipp Wehr, SPD (until 20 February 1960)
 August Weimer, CDU
 Otto Weinkamm, CSU
 Erwin Welke, SPD
 Heinrich Welslau, SPD
 Emmi Welter, CDU
 Ernst Weltner, SPD
 Helmut Wendelborn, CDU
 Friedrich Werber, CDU
 Rudolf Werner, CDU (from 24 July 1959)
 Helene Wessel, SPD
 Karl Wienand, SPD
 Karl Wieninger, CSU
 Werner Wilhelm, SPD (from 5 September 1958)
 Hans Wilhelmi, CDU
 Rudolf Will, FDP
 Friedrich Wilhelm Willeke, CDU
 Heinrich Windelen, CDU
 Bernhard Winkelheide, CDU
 Friedrich Winter, CSU
 Hans-Jürgen Wischnewski, SPD
 Franz Wittmann, CSU
 Kurt Wittmer-Eigenbrodt, CDU
 Karl Wittrock, SPD
 Herbert Wolff, CDU (until 15 October 1958)
 Jeanette Wolff, SPD
 Josef Worms, CDU
 Franz-Josef Wuermeling, CDU
 Heinrich Wullenhaupt, CDU

Z 

 Alois Zimmer, CDU
 Friedrich Zimmermann, CSU
 Siegfried Zoglmann, FDP
 Ernst Zühlke, SPD

See also 

 Politics of Germany
 List of Bundestag Members

03